The Subsequent Nuremberg trials (also Nuremberg Military Tribunals, 1946–1949) were twelve military tribunals for war crimes committed by the leaders of Nazi Germany (1933–1945). The Nuremberg Military Tribunals occurred after the Nuremberg trials, held by the International Military Tribunal, which concluded in October 1946. The subsequent Nuremberg trials were held by U.S. military courts and dealt with the cases of crimes against humanity committed by the business community of Nazi Germany, specifically the crimes of using slave labor and plundering occupied countries, and the war-crime cases of Wehrmacht officers who committed atrocities against Allied prisoners of war, partisans, and guerrillas.

Background
The Allies had initially planned to convene several international trials for war crimes at the International Military Tribunal, but failed because the Allies could not agree upon the proper legal management and disposition of military and civilian war criminals; however, the Control Council Law No. 10 (20 December 1945) of the Allied Control Council empowered the military authorities of every occupation zone in Germany to place on trial people and soldiers suspected of being war criminals. Based on this law, the U.S. authorities proceeded after the end of the initial Nuremberg Trial against the major war criminals to hold another twelve trials in Nuremberg. The judges in all these trials were American, and so were the prosecutors; the Chief of Counsel for the Prosecution was Brigadier General Telford Taylor. In the other occupation zones, similar trials took place.

Trials
The twelve U.S. trials before the Nuremberg Military Tribunals (NMT) took place from 9 December 1946 to 13 April 1949. The trials were as follows:

Result

The Nuremberg process initiated 3,887 cases of which about 3,400 were dropped.  489 cases went to trial, involving 1,672 defendants. 1,416 of them were found guilty; fewer than 200 were executed, and another 279 defendants were sentenced to life in prison. By the 1950s almost all of them had been released.

Many of the longer prison sentences were reduced substantially by an amnesty under the decree of high commissioner John J. McCloy in 1951, after intense political pressure. Ten outstanding death sentences from the Einsatzgruppen Trial were converted to prison terms. Many others who had received prison sentences were released outright.

Criticism
Some of the NMTs have been criticised for their conclusion that "morale bombing" of civilians, including its nuclear variety, was legal, and for their judgment that, in certain situations, executing civilians in reprisal was permissible.

See also
 Auschwitz Trial held in Kraków, Poland in 1947 against 40 SS-staff of the Auschwitz concentration camp death factory
 Frankfurt Auschwitz Trials, 1963–1965
 Majdanek Trials, held against Majdanek extermination camp officials. Longest Nazi war crimes trial in history, spanning over 30 years
 Chełmno Trials of the Chełmno extermination camp personnel, held in Poland and Germany. The cases were decided almost twenty years apart
 Sobibor Trial held in Hagen, Germany in 1965, concerning the Sobibor extermination camp
 Belzec Trial before the 1st Munich District Court in the mid-1960s, eight SS-men of the Belzec extermination camp
 Belsen Trial in Lüneburg, 1945
 Command responsibility doctrine of hierarchical accountability
 Dachau Trials held within the walls of the former Dachau concentration camp, 1945–1948
 Mauthausen-Gusen camp trials, 1946–1947
 Ravensbrück Trial
 Research Materials: Max Planck Society Archive

References

Further reading

External links
The NMT proceedings at the Mazal Library.
An overview.

1946 in Germany
1947 in Germany
1948 in Germany
1949 in Germany
History of Nuremberg